
The James D. and Alice Butler House, commonly known as the Butler House, is a historic house museum in Deerfield Beach, Florida. It is located at 380 East Hillsboro Boulevard. On July 28, 1995, it was added to the U.S. National Register of Historic Places.

Building
Built in the Mediterranean Revival style it was the home of early Deerfield Beach settlers and civic leaders, James D. and Alice Wood Butler. Alice Butler obtained the plans for the house from a popular ladies' magazine, the Ladies Home Journal of September 1923. The building is constructed of hollow tile, the interior walls are plaster on lath and the roof is made from Spanish terracotta tiles.

In 1974 the home was designated a Florida Historic Site. In 1977 the Butler family deeded the home and grounds to the Deerfield Beach Historical Society which operates it as a historic house museum.

Modern times
The Butler House has been fully restored and contains many of the original furnishings, an exception being the dining room table that was replaced after the original had been used to protect the west dining room window during the San Felipe Segundo hurricane in 1928. The property features a one–hundred year old Banyan tree where the Deerfield Beach Historical Society holds events. The society operates the property as an event venue and maintains its headquarters there in addition to the function of the home as a museum.

References

External links

 
 

Houses in Broward County, Florida
Houses on the National Register of Historic Places in Florida
Museums in Deerfield Beach, Florida
National Register of Historic Places in Broward County, Florida
Historic house museums in Florida
Spanish Colonial Revival architecture in Florida
Houses completed in 1924